George Washington White (May 6, 1931 – November 12, 2011) was a United States district judge of the United States District Court for the Northern District of Ohio.

Education and career

Born in Duquesne, Pennsylvania, White received a Juris Doctor from the Cleveland State University College of Law in 1955. He was in private practice in Cleveland, Ohio from 1956 to 1968. He was a Referee for the Court of Common Pleas in Cuyahoga County, Ohio from 1957 to 1962. He was a city councilman in Cleveland from 1963 to 1968. He was a judge of the Court of Common Pleas from 1968 to 1980.

Federal judicial service

He was confirmed by the United States Senate on May 21, 1980, and received his commission on May 23, 1980. He served as Chief Judge from 1995 to 1999. He assumed senior status on February 26, 1999. White died on November 12, 2011, in Mayfield Heights, Ohio.

See also 
 List of African-American federal judges
 List of African-American jurists

References

Sources
 

1931 births
2011 deaths
Cleveland–Marshall College of Law alumni
Cleveland City Council members
Ohio state court judges
African-American judges
Judges of the United States District Court for the Northern District of Ohio
United States district court judges appointed by Jimmy Carter
20th-century American judges